John Sharples (8 August 1934 – 1 September 2001) was an English professional footballer who played in the Football League as a full back for Aston Villa and Walsall. He was born in Heath Town, Wolverhampton.

References

1934 births
2001 deaths
Footballers from Wolverhampton
English footballers
Association football fullbacks
Aston Villa F.C. players
Walsall F.C. players
English Football League players
Place of death missing
Darlaston Town F.C. players